East District is a district in east Chiayi City, Taiwan. The district is the city seat of Chiayi City.

History

The East District was established on 6 October 1990.

Administrative divisions
East District consists of the following villages:
()
Duanzhu, Lantan, Dongchuan, Luliao, Lucuo, Wenya, Wangtian, Changzhu, Houzhuang, Xindian, Zuntou
()
Zhongshan, Taiping, Dongxing, Huanan, Zhongyang, Zhaoyang, Minzu, Guogou
()
Xinkai, Xuanxin, Xingnan, Fengnian, Fangcao, Fang'an, Dingliao, Anliao, Anye, Xingcun, Xing'an, Xingren
()
Beimen, Linsen, Zhongzhuang, Dingzhuang, Yijiao, Renyi, Houhu and Laoteng.

Government institutions
 Chiayi City Hall

Education
 National Chiayi University - Lantan Main Campus and Linsen Campus
 Tatung Institute of Commerce and Technology
 Chung Jen College of Nursing, Health Science and Management

Tourist attractions
 Alishan Forest Railway Garage Park
 Chiayi City Cultural Park
 Chiayi Botanical Garden
 Chiayi Jen Wu Temple
 Chiayi Municipal Museum
 Chiayi Park
 Chiayi Confucian Temple
 Kagi Shrine
 Sun-Shooting Tower
 Chiayi Prison Museum
 Hinoki Village
 Lantan Lake
 St. John's Cathedral
 The First 228 Peace Memorial Monument
 Water Source Water Meter Room

Transportation
 TRA Jiabei Station

See also
 Chiayi City
 The First 228 Peace Memorial Monument

References